Scott James Taylor (born 5 May 1976) is an English football coach and former professional footballer.

As a player, he was a striker who notably played in the Premier League for Bolton Wanderers. He also played in the Football League for Millwall, Rotherham United, Blackpool, Tranmere Rovers, Stockport County, Plymouth Argyle, Milton Keynes Dons, Brentford and Rochdale. He played in non-league football with Grays Athletic and Lewes. He later had a spell with Staines Town where he was also the club's assistant manager.

Playing career
Taylor started his professional career at Millwall where he played 28 games before being signed by Bolton for £150,000 in March 1996. Taylor failed to break into the Bolton side and only managed to score three goals in all competitions. One of these goals came in the memorable 6–1 League Cup win over Premier League side Tottenham Hotspur, when Bolton were in the second tier. After loan spells at Rotherham United and Blackpool, he signed for Tranmere Rovers in October 1998 for a fee of £350,000. Taylor played over 100 games for Tranmere in almost three years and played the full 90 minutes in the 2000 Football League Cup Final before signing for Stockport County on a free transfer in July 2001.

His stay at Stockport was short lived, and he signed for Blackpool, this time on a permanent deal, in January 2002. It was at Blackpool that Taylor enjoyed the most successful part of his career to date, scoring 61 goals in all competitions in a two-year spell. In 2002 he started and scored in the final as Blackpool won the 2001–02 Football League Trophy. His goalscoring record resulted in a £100,000 transfer to Championship side Plymouth Argyle. "I had a great time at Blackpool," he said shortly after the move south. "I got on really well with the fans and, whatever anyone says, was sad to go. It was because of serious issues in my personal life at the time, and it was forced upon me. Things are finally looking up now and I hope both us and Blackpool stay up – I certainly think with Simon Grayson in charge they will beat the drop."

Taylor failed to establish himself at Home Park and moved to Milton Keynes Dons in January 2006. On 11 February 2006, he scored against Blackpool during a 3–0 victory for the Dons.

On 8 March 2007, Taylor signed for Brentford in a one-month loan deal. He made six appearances (three as a substitute) without scoring, before returning to MK Dons at the end of the loan spell. He then went out on loan again to Rochdale in late 2007.

Grays Athletic announced on 18 January 2008 that, Taylor signed for the Blues until the end of the 2007–08 season. The striker's first goals for the club came on his third appearance, in the form of a hat-trick in the Conference League Cup against Welling United, on 29 January 2008.

On 7 July 2008, it was confirmed Taylor had signed for Conference National newcomers Lewes. Manager Kevin Keehan told BBC Southern Counties Radio: "He's a very intelligent footballer and brings other people into the game. "He will create as well as score. I couldn't be happier we've signed him."

On 28 November, Taylor was released from his contract at Lewes and re-signed for former club Staines Town.

On 2 May 2009, Taylor came on as a substitute and scored the only goal of Staines Town's Isthmian League Premier Division play-off final against Carshalton Athletic. Taylor came on and scored in extra time after Staines goalkeeper Louis Wells saved a penalty in normal time to clinch promotion to the Conference South.

Personal life
Taylor is a trainee electrician, since turning to part-time football.

Honours
Individual
PFA Team of the Year: 2003–04 Second Division

References

External links

1976 births
Sportspeople from Chertsey
Living people
Association football forwards
English footballers
Staines Town F.C. players
Millwall F.C. players
Bolton Wanderers F.C. players
Rotherham United F.C. players
Blackpool F.C. players
Tranmere Rovers F.C. players
Stockport County F.C. players
Plymouth Argyle F.C. players
Milton Keynes Dons F.C. players
Brentford F.C. players
Rochdale A.F.C. players
Grays Athletic F.C. players
Lewes F.C. players
Premier League players
English Football League players
National League (English football) players